Davenport Creek is a  long 1st order tributary to the Fisher River in Surry County, North Carolina.

Course
Davenport Creek rises about 1.5 miles south of Stony Knoll, North Carolina.  Davenport Creek then flows southwest to join the Fisher River about 1.5 miles east-northeast of Crutchfield, North Carolina.

Watershed
Davenport Creek drains  of area, receives about 47.8 in/year of precipitation, has a wetness index of 345.68, and is about 44% forested.

See also
List of rivers of North Carolina

References

Rivers of North Carolina
Rivers of Surry County, North Carolina